New Classics Media   is a Chinese entertainment and media company established in 2007 that primarily invests in and produces television shows and films. It has been owned by Tencent since 2017.

Productions

References

External links
 Official website
 Official Weibo

Mass media companies of China
Companies based in Beijing
Mass media companies established in 2004
Chinese companies established in 2004
Tangren Media